Maddow is a surname. Notable people with the surname include:

Ben Maddow (1909–1992), American screenwriter and documentarian
Rachel Maddow (born 1973), American television host, political commentator, and author

See also
Maddox (surname)